Mallory Township is a township in Clayton County, Iowa, USA. At the 2010 census, its population was 395, down from 411 ten years earlier.

Geography
According to the USGS, it contains seven cemeteries: Bethel, Bolsinger, Brown, Hansel, King, Koenig and Noggle.

The streams of Joles Creek, Mill Creek and Peck Creek run through this township.

References
 USGS Geographic Names Information System (GNIS)

External links
 US-Counties.com
 City-Data.com

Townships in Clayton County, Iowa
Townships in Iowa